Toni Fuidias Ribera (born 15 April 2001) is a Spanish professional footballer who plays as a goalkeeper for La Liga club Girona.

Career
After spending the first years of his career at Real Madrid Castilla, he moved to Girona in the summer of 2022. He made his professional debut for the club on 13 November 2022, putting on an impressive display in a 2–1 extra time win over Tercera División club Quintanar del Rey in the Copa del Rey first round.

Career statistics

Club

Honours
Real Madrid
La Liga: 2021–22
Supercopa de España: 2021–22
UEFA Champions League: 2021–22

References

External links
 Profile at the Girona FC website

2001 births
Living people
Spanish footballers
Association football goalkeepers
Segunda División B players
Primera Federación players
Real Madrid Castilla footballers
Real Madrid CF players
Girona FC players